Rideau Park School may refer to:
 Rideau Park School - Edmonton Public Schools - Edmonton, Alberta
 Rideau Park School - Calgary Board of Education - Calgary, Alberta